Iwasa Matabei (original name Araki Katsumochi  1578 – July 20, 1650) was a Japanese artist of the early Tokugawa period, who specialized in genre scenes of historical events and illustrations of classical Chinese and Japanese literature, as well as portraits. He was the son of Araki Murashige, a prominent daimyō of the Sengoku period who had been made to commit suicide, leaving Matabei to be raised with his mother's family name, Iwasa.  

Matabei's work was noted for its distinctive figures, with large heads and delicately drawn features, and he was effective both in colour and monochrome ink-wash painting, using an individual brush technique combining Tosa and Kanō elements. 
Although trained by Kanō Naizen of the Kanō school, he was more influenced by the traditions of the Tosa school, and signed a late series of portraits of the Thirty-six Poetry Immortals (1640) commissioned by the shōgun Tokugawa Iemitsu for a temple as "the artist Matabei of the later current from Tosa Mitsunobu".  His work is often regarded as a major influence on the developing ukiyo-e school of painting, which is possibly because of confusion with an ukiyo-e artist character with the same name (Ōtsu no Matabei) in a play by Chikamatsu.  Also, he used often to be attributed as the painter of a famous early ukiyo-e screen known as the Hikone screen, but this is now considered incorrect. In fact his "patrons ... were so high in the social hierarchy that it is hard to believe that Matabei could have created the Ukiyo-e tradition", and he is better regarded as a "great independent artist of the Tosa tradition".

His son Katsushige (d. 1673) was also a painter, known for dancing figures in a style like that of his father.

Notes

References
Encyclopædia Britannica, "Iwasa Matabei"
Paine, Robert Treat, in: Paine, R. T. & Soper A, "The Art and Architecture of Japan", Pelican History of Art, 3rd ed 1981, Penguin (now Yale History of Art),

External links
Bridge of dreams: the Mary Griggs Burke collection of Japanese art, a catalog from The Metropolitan Museum of Art Libraries (fully available online as PDF), which contains material on Iwasa Matabei (see index)
Personal history of Iwasa Matabei - Jyuluck-Do Corporation

1578 births
1650 deaths
Ukiyo-e artists
16th-century Japanese people
17th-century Japanese artists
Japanese portrait painters
People from Itami, Hyōgo